Kryoneri is a seaside settlement in the community of Galatas, located about 14 km east from Messolonghi and west of Antirrio in Nafpaktia, Aetolia-Acarnania, Greece. According to the 2011 census, it had 94 inhabitants.

Description

Kryoneri is situated on the northeast coast of the Gulf of Patras and lies next to the Varasova mountain, one of the most popular rock climbing areas in Greece.

History
With the Kapodistrias reform of 1997, Kryoneri became part of the municipality of Chalkeia, which since 2011 is a municipal unit of the municipality of Nafpaktia.

Population history

Notable people
Giannis Tsimitselis, actor

References

Populated places in Aetolia-Acarnania
Nafpaktia